Lord High Admiral can refer to:
 Lord High Admiral of the United Kingdom (of England until 1707, of Great Britain until 1709, and of the United Kingdom from 1964 to date)
 Lord High Admiral of Scotland
 Lord High Admiral of the Wash
 Lord High Admiral of Sweden
 Lord High Admiral, Pimlico, London public house

See also
 List of Lords High Admiral 
 List of the First Lords of the Admiralty
 List of Lords Commissioners of the Admiralty